The B 243 runs from Hildesheim over Seesen and Herzberg am Harz to Nordhausen.

Route

Districts and municipalities 
 Lower Saxony
 Hildesheim (district)
 Hildesheim
 Diekholzen: Egenstedt
 Bad Salzdetfurth: Groß Düngen, Wesseln
 Bockenem: Nette, Bönnien, Bockenem, Bornum
 Goslar (district)
 Seesen: Rhüden, Bornhausen, Seesen, Engelade, Münchehof
 Osterode am Harz (district)
 Samtgemeinde Bad Grund: Gittelde, Windhausen, Badenhausen
 Osterode am Harz: Katzenstein, Lasfelde, Petershütte, Osterode, Osterode-Leege
 Hörden am Harz: Aschenhütte
 Herzberg am Harz: Herzberg, Scharzfeld
 Bad Lauterberg im Harz: Barbis, Bartolfelde, Osterhagen
 Bad Sachsa: Nüxei
 Thuringia
 Nordhausen (district)
 Hohenstein: Mackenrode, Holbach
 Werther: Günzerode

Combined routing 
 From Seesen to AS Engelade combined with the B 248
 Between AS Münchehof and Bad Grund combined with the B 242
 In Osterode between Osterode Mitte and Osterode Süd combined with the B 241
 Between Herzberg and Barbis combined with the B 27

Rivers crossed 
 Beuster, near Hildesheim-Marienburg
 Lamme, near Wesseln
 Nette, near Bockenem and Engelade
 Söse, in Osterode
 Sieber, in Herzberg
 Oder, in Barbis – village in borough of Bad Lauterberg
 Steina, in Nüxei – village in borough of Bad Sachsa
 Klettenberger Mühlgraben, near Holbach

History

Origins 
The metalled artificial road (Chaussee) between Seesen and Osterode was built between 1785 and 1795 as an extension of the Frankfurt Road and known as the Thuringian Road (Thüringer Straße).

It was established as Reichsstraße 243 between Hildesheim and Nordhausen in 1937.

This federal road was interrupted by the division of Germany and was only opened again from end to end on 18 November 1989 when the border crossing between Nüxei and Mackenrode was installed.

See also 
 List of federal highways in Germany

References 

243
Transport in the Harz